Sadeqlu or Sadiqlu or Sediqlu may refer to:

Sadeqlu, Hamadan
Sadeqlu, Isfahan